Avercamp is a surname. Notable people with the surname include:

Hendrick Avercamp (1585–1634), Dutch painter
Barent Avercamp (1612–1679), Dutch painter